Robert Wesley Page (January 22, 1927 – June 29, 2010) was an American businessman who served as United States Assistant Secretary of the Army (Civil Works) from 1987 to 1990.

Biography
Page was born on January 22, 1927, in Dallas, Texas.  During World War II, he served in the United States Navy in the Pacific Theater.  After the war, he attended Texas A&M University, graduating with a B.S. in 1951.

Page was recruited by the Central Intelligence Agency after graduation. He spent over two years with the agency, including an assignment in Iran. Later in the 1950s, Page taught engineering at the American University of Beirut.

From 1961 to 1962, Page was vice president of the Southeast Drilling Company.  He was assistant general manager at Bechtel from 1962 to 1967.  In 1967, he became vice president of construction of Rockefeller Family and Associates, working there until 1972 when he became president and CEO of the George A. Fuller Co.  From 1976 to 1981, he was president and CEO of the Rust Engineering Co.  He became president and CEO of M.W. Kellogg in 1981, and was then president and CEO of Kellogg Rust, Inc. from 1983 to 1984.  He remained at Kellogg, Rust, Inc. until 1987.  He was Chairman of the Panama Canal Commission from December 1985 until May 1987.

In 1987, President of the United States Ronald Reagan nominated Page as Assistant Secretary of the Army (Civil Works), and he assumed office in December 1987.  He was later re-nominated to the post by George H. W. Bush and served as Assistant Secretary until October 1990.

After leaving government service, Page was Executive Vice President of McDermott International, Inc., from 1991 until 1994.

Personal
Page was the son of Archie Cleo Page (December 20, 1899 – May 4, 1980) and Zelma Tyler (September 4, 1910 – March 20, 1967), who were married on March 28, 1925 but later divorced.

Page married Nancy Anne Eaton on July 13, 1952, in Springfield, Massachusetts. The couple had three sons and a daughter.

Page died at his home in the Georgetown neighborhood of Washington, D.C., on June 29, 2010.

References

External links
President Bush's nomination of Page as Assistant Secretary
Profile at the Dept. of the Army

1927 births
2010 deaths
People from Dallas
United States Navy sailors
United States Navy personnel of World War II
Texas A&M University alumni
People of the Central Intelligence Agency
Academic staff of the American University of Beirut
United States Army civilians
Reagan administration personnel
George H. W. Bush administration personnel